Telangana Rashtra Sadhana Front, a front of dissident pro-Telangana statehood parties in the Indian state of Andhra Pradesh, formed ahead of the 2004 general elections. The member parties of Telangana Rashtra Sadhana Front was at that time Telangana Rashtra Party, Telangana Janata Party and Telangana Communist Party.

The convenor of Telangana Rashtra Sadhana Front was Katakam Mruthyunjayam. G. Innaiah of Telangana Rashtra Party was the co-convenor.

Political parties in Telangana
2004 establishments in Andhra Pradesh
Political parties established in 2004